Amazon Delta is a huge river delta formed by the Amazon River and Tocantins River (through the Pará River distributary channel), in northern South America. It is located in the Brazilian states of Pará and Amapá and encompasses the Marajó Archipelago, in Pará, whose largest representative is the Marajó island. The main cities located in the vicinity are Belém and Macapá (both with their respective metropolitan regions).

References 

River deltas
Geography of South America